The Boa Vista Island League or Championships is a regional championship played in Boa Vista Island, Cape Verde. The winner of the championship plays in the Cape Verdean football Championships of each season. It is organized by the Boa Vista Regional Football Association (Associação Regional de Futebol da Boa Vista, abbreviation: ARFBV).  Since 2010, it has the largest regional football association governing body in area in the nation.

Académica Operária won the most titles numbering nineteen, Sal Rei is second now numbering ten with their recent championship win.

During the 2004-05 season as Sal-Rei was also the national winner and received automatic qualification (the first to do so), second place Desportivo Estância Baixo qualified into the 2005 National Championships, the only time a second place club qualified from Boa Vista.

History
The island league was founded around 1978.

The regional association started out with four clubs in 1978, together with Brava and Maio the fewest clubs of each championship in Cape Verde for a couple of years.  It rose to five clubs in the 1990s, and later matched Sal and even later Brava with six clubs, the nation's least at the time.  In 2004, it possessed one club more than neighbouring Sal to the north, but matched with Brava's club total for the fourth least.  When Onze Estrelas was registered in 2010, it had eight clubs, more than Brava and another nearby island of Maio to the south, and was ranked 8th out of 11 championships by number of clubs; later it became 7th in 2011.  When nearby Sal added their Second Division in 2014, its club totals became 8th out of 11th in the nation, after Maio's addition of five clubs in 2015 ranked Boa Vista's club totals of 9th out of 11th in the nation and it is the current total.

Title history
Almost every championship title won are based in Sal Rei with only one title that was won by Bofareira of the north of the island.  Before 2010, every title won on the island were a club only based in Sal Rei.

Boa Vista Island League – Clubs 2016–17
Source:

Académica (Sal Rei)
África Show (Rabil)
Desportivo Estância Baixo
Juventude (Norte, Cape Verde)
Onze Estrelas (Bofarreira)
Sal-Rei
Sanjoanense
Sporting Clube da Boa Vista - Sal Rei

Winners
Source:

1977-78: Académica Operária
1978-79: Académica Operária
1979-80: not known
1980-81: not known
1981-82: Académica Operária
1982-83: Académica Operária
1983-84: not known
1984-85: Sal-Rei
1985-'86: Sal-Rei/Académica Operária?
1987 & 1988: not known
1988-89: Académica Operária
1989-90: not known or not held
1990-91: Académica Operária
1991-92: not known or not held
1992-93: Académica Operária
1993–94: Sal-Rei
1994–95: Académica Operária
1995–96: Académica Operária
1996–97: Académica Operária
1997–98: Sal-Rei
1998–99: Académica Operária
1999–2000: Académica Operária
2000–01: not held
2001–02: Académica Operária
2002–03: Académica Operária
2003–04: Sal-Rei
2004–05: Sal-Rei
2005–06: Sal-Rei
2006–07: Sal-Rei
2007–08: Sal-Rei
2008–09: Académica Operária
2009–10: Sporting
2010–11: Sal-Rei
2011–12: Académica Operária
2012–13: Onze Estrelas
2013–14: Académica Operária
2014–15: Académica Operária
2015–16: Sal Rei
2016–17: Sal Rei
2017–18: Sal Rei

Performance by club

See also
Boa Vista Island Cup
Boa Vista Island Super Cup
Boa Vista Island Opening Tournament

Notes

References

External links
Boa Vista Island League 
Boa Vista Regional Championships at Sports Midia 

 
Second level football leagues in Cape Verde
1978 establishments in Cape Verde
Sports leagues established in 1978